Blondie is an American rock band co-founded by singer Debbie Harry and guitarist Chris Stein. The band was a pioneer in the American new wave scene of the mid-1970s in New York. Their first two albums contained strong elements of punk and new wave, and although highly successful in the UK and Australia, Blondie was regarded as an underground band in the U.S. until the release of Parallel Lines in 1978. Over the next four years, the band achieved several hit singles including "Heart of Glass," "Call Me," "Atomic," "The Tide Is High," and "Rapture". The band became noted for its eclectic mix of musical styles, also incorporating elements of disco, pop, reggae, and early rap music.

Blondie disbanded after the release of its sixth studio album, The Hunter, in 1982. Debbie Harry continued to pursue a solo career with varied results after taking a few years off to care for partner Chris Stein, who was diagnosed with pemphigus, a rare autoimmune disease of the skin. The band re-formed in 1997, achieving renewed success and their sixth number one single in the United Kingdom with "Maria" in 1999, exactly 20 years after their first UK No. 1 single ("Heart of Glass").

The group toured and performed throughout the world during the following years, and was inducted into the Rock and Roll Hall of Fame in 2006. Blondie has sold around 40 million records worldwide and is still active. The band's eleventh studio album, Pollinator, was released on May 5, 2017.

History

1974–1978: Early career
Inspired by the burgeoning new music scene at the Mercer Arts Center in Manhattan, Chris Stein sought to join a similar band. He joined the Stilettoes in 1973 as their guitarist and formed a romantic relationship with one of the band's vocalists, Debbie Harry, a former waitress and Playboy Bunny. Harry had been a member of a folk-rock band, the Wind in the Willows, in the late 1960s. In July 1974, Stein and Harry parted ways with the Stilettoes and Elda Gentile, the band's originator, forming a new band with ex-Stilettoes bandmates Billy O'Connor (drums; born October 4, 1953, Germany, died March 29, 2015, Pittsburgh, Pennsylvania) and Fred Smith (bass). Originally billed as Angel and the Snake for two shows in August 1974, they had renamed themselves Blondie by October 1974, while Ivan Kral joined the band on guitar. The new name derived from comments made by truck drivers who catcalled "Hey, Blondie" to Harry as they drove past.

By the spring of 1975, O'Conner had left the music business and Smith replaced Richard Hell in Television, while Kral eventually joined the Patti Smith Group. Stein and Harry continued the band and proceeded with auditions to recruit drummer Clem Burke and bass player Gary Valentine (Gary J. Lachman). 

Blondie became regular performers at Max's Kansas City and CBGB. In June 1975, the band's first recording came in the way of a demo produced by Alan Betrock. To fill out their sound, they recruited keyboard player Jimmy Destri in November 1975. The band signed with Private Stock Records and released their first single "X-Offender" in June 1976, while their debut album, Blondie, was issued in December 1976. Neither was initially a commercial success and the band spent the rest of the year touring with Television and visiting the UK. Blondie opened for David Bowie and Iggy Pop on the latter's US tour in early 1977 supporting The Idiot. The band was invited by Bowie and Pop after the pair had heard the band's debut album. In July 1977 Valentine decided to leave the band and form The Know, he was replaced by Frank Infante. 

In September 1977, the band bought back its contract with Private Stock and signed with British label Chrysalis Records. The first album was re-released on the new label in October 1977. Rolling Stones review of the debut album observed the eclectic nature of the group's music, comparing it to Phil Spector and the Who, and commented that the album's two strengths were Richard Gottehrer's production and the persona of Debbie Harry. 
The band's first commercial success occurred in Australia in 1977, when the music television program Countdown mistakenly played their video "In the Flesh", which was the B-side of the single "X-Offender". Jimmy Destri later credited the show's Molly Meldrum for their initial success, commenting that "we still thank him to this day" for playing the wrong song. In a 1998 interview, drummer Clem Burke recalled seeing the episode in which the wrong song was played, but he and Chris Stein suggested that it may have been a deliberate subterfuge on the part of Meldrum. Stein asserted that "X-Offender" was "too crazy and aggressive [to become a hit]", while "In the Flesh" was "not representative of any punk sensibility. Over the years, I've thought they probably played both things but liked one better. That's all." In retrospect, Burke described "In the Flesh" as "a forerunner to the power ballad".

The single reached number 2 in Australia, while the album reached the Australian top twenty in November 1977, and a subsequent double-A release of "X-Offender" and "Rip Her to Shreds" reached number 81. A successful Australian tour followed in December, though it was marred by an incident in Brisbane when disappointed fans almost rioted after Harry cancelled a performance due to illness.

In February 1978, Blondie released their second album, Plastic Letters (UK No. 10, US No. 78, Australia No. 64). The album was recorded as a four-piece during the summer of 1977, with Stein responsible for both bass and guitars. Plastic Letters was promoted extensively throughout Europe and Asia by Chrysalis Records. The album's first single, "Denis", was a cover version of the Randy and the Rainbows' 1963 hit "Denise". It reached number two on the British singles charts, while both the album and its second single, "(I'm Always Touched by Your) Presence, Dear", reached the British top ten. Chart success, along with a successful 1978 UK tour, including a gig at London's Roundhouse, made Blondie one of the first American new wave bands to achieve mainstream success in the United Kingdom. With Infante moving to guitar, the British musician Nigel Harrison was hired as the group's full-time bassist, expanding Blondie to a six-piece for the first time and band's line-up had stabilized.

1978–1981: Mainstream success

Blondie completed the recording of their third album, Parallel Lines during the summer of 1978 together with Australian producer Mike Chapman. It was released in September of that year and reached No. 1 in the UK, No. 6 in the US and No. 2 in Australia. It finally broke the band into the American market on the strength of the worldwide hit single "Heart of Glass". Parallel Lines became the group's most successful album, selling 20 million copies worldwide. The album's first two singles were "Picture This" (UK No. 12) and "Hanging on the Telephone" (UK No. 5). As the band previously had success with a cover, Chrysalis Records chose their version of Buddy Holly's "I'm Gonna Love You Too" as the lead single from Parallel Lines in the United States. This turned out to be a miscalculation as the single failed to chart.

"Heart of Glass" was released in early 1979 and the disco-infused track topped the UK charts in February 1979, then the US charts in April 1979. It was a reworking of a rock and reggae-influenced song that the group had performed since its formation in the mid 1970s, updated with strong elements of disco music. Clem Burke later said the revamped version was inspired partly by Kraftwerk and partly by the Bee Gees' "Stayin' Alive", whose drum beat Burke tried to emulate. He and Stein gave Jimmy Destri much of the credit for the final result, noting that Destri's appreciation of technology had led him to introduce synthesizers and to rework the keyboard sections. Although some critics condemned Blondie for "selling out" by dabbling in disco, the song became a worldwide success and one of the biggest selling singles of 1979. As the focal point for the band, Harry began to attain a celebrity status that set her apart from the other band members. She also embarked on an acting career and appeared in the film The Foreigner directed by Amos Poe.

Blondie's next single in the US was a more aggressive rock song, "One Way or Another" (US No. 24), though in the UK, an alternate single choice, "Sunday Girl", became a No. 1 hit. Parallel Lines has been ranked No. 140 on Rolling Stone's list of 500 greatest albums of all time. In June 1979, Blondie, photographed by Annie Leibovitz, was featured on the cover of Rolling Stone magazine. In the summer of 1979, the band returned to the studio with Chapman to record their next album.

Blondie's fourth album, Eat to the Beat (UK No. 1, US No. 17, Australia No. 9), alos produced by Chapman, was released in September 1979. Though well received by critics as a suitable follow-up to Parallel Lines, the album and its singles failed to achieve the same level of success in the US. In the UK, the album delivered three top 20 hits, including the band's third UK number one ("Atomic", UK No. 1, US No. 39). The lead track off the album, "Dreaming" featuring Ellie Greenwich. reached No. 2 in the UK. But it only made it to number 27 in the US. The second single "Union City Blue" (UK No. 13) shared the title of a film featuring Harry, directed by Marcus Reichert. The single was not released in the US in favor of the track "The Hardest Part". Chrysalis Records' Linda Carhart asked Jon Roseman Productions US division to shoot videos for every song and create the first ever video album. David Mallet directed and Paul Flattery produced it at various locations and studios in and around New York. It was nominated for a Grammy, the first year the Recording Academy instituted an award for music videos. At the end of the year, the show filmed at the Apollo theatre in Glasgow was broadcast by the BBC on the Old Grey Whistle Test. In March 1980 "Atomic" becomes No. 1 in the UK while the album is certified gold the next month. 

Blondie's next single, the Grammy-nominated "Call Me", was the result of Debbie Harry's collaboration with the Italian songwriter and producer Giorgio Moroder, who had been responsible for Donna Summer's biggest hits. The track was recorded as the title theme of the Richard Gere film American Gigolo. Released in February 1980 in the US, "Call Me" spent six consecutive weeks at No. 1 in the US and Canada, reached No. 1 in the U.K. (where it was released in April 1980) and became a global hit. The single was also No. 1 on Billboard magazine's 1980 year-end chart. In the summer of 1980, the band appeared in a bit part in the film Roadie starring Meat Loaf. Blondie performed the Johnny Cash song "Ring of Fire". The live recording was featured on the film soundtrack, and on a later CD reissue of the Eat to the Beat album.

In November 1980, Blondie's fifth studio album, Autoamerican (UK No. 3, US No. 7, Australia No. 8) and third with Chapman was released; it contained two more No. 1 US hits: the reggae-styled "The Tide Is High", a cover version of a 1967 song written by John Holt of the Paragons, and the rap-flavored "Rapture", which was the first song featuring rapping to reach number one in the US. In the song Harry mentions the hip hop and graffiti artist Fab Five Freddy who also appears in the video for the song. Autoamerican featured a far wider stylistic range than previous Blondie albums, including the avant-garde instrumental "Europa", the acoustic jazz of "Faces", and "Follow Me" (from the Broadway show "Camelot"). The album went on to achieve platinum success in both the United States and the United Kingdom.

Blondie took a brief break for most of 1981. Debbie Harry hosted Saturday Night Live in February 1981, with Stein and Burke backing her during her musical performances. Harry and Destri both released solo albums. Stein worked on Harry's album KooKoo (UK No. 6, US No. 28) produced by Nile Rodgers and Bernard Edwards. He also joined Burke on Destri's album Heart on a Wall. Burke also played drums on Eurythmics' debut album In The Garden. Harry, Stein and Destri also worked together on music for the 1981 John Waters film Polyester.

In October 1981, Chrysalis Records released The Best of Blondie (UK No. 4, US No. 30, Australia No. 1), the group's first greatest hits compilation.

1982: The Hunter and breakup
The band reconvened in December 1981 to record a new album, The Hunter, released in May 1982 (UK No. 9, US No. 33, Australia No. 15). Infante sued the band but was later reinstated after an out-of-court settlement. In contrast to their earlier commercial and critical successes, The Hunter was poorly received. The album did have two moderate hit singles: "Island of Lost Souls" (UK# 11, US No. 37, Australia No. 13) and "War Child" (UK No. 39). The album also included "For Your Eyes Only", a track the band had been commissioned to write and record for the 1981 James Bond film of the same name, but was rejected by the film's producers (the producers ultimately chose another song with that title that would be recorded by Sheena Easton).

In June 1982 Harry contributed backing vocals to The Gun Club's second album Miami, being credited as 'D.H. Lawrence Jr' while Chris Stein also produced the record, and is credited as 'bongos' and 'cover photos/design'. The Gun Club's singer Jeffrey Lee Pierce was a fan, emulating Harry's hairstyle and founding the West Coast Blondie Fan Club, before becoming friends with the band in New York.

For the brief North American tour (July–August 1982) to promote the Hunter album, guitarist Frank Infante was replaced with session musician Eddie Martinez. Also added to the live lineup were second keyboardist Abel Domingues, and a three-man horn section (Douglas Harris, Joseph Kohanski, and Arthur Pugh.) A UK/European tour was cancelled due to poor ticket sales. 

When Stein was diagnosed with the life-threatening illness pemphigus, the band announced publicly in November 1982 that they had disbanded.

Harry embarked on solo career in the mid-1980s, but two singles (1983's "Rush Rush", from the film Scarface, and 1985's "Feel The Spin") while she continued to feature in films. She released the album Rockbird in 1986, with active participation from Stein. The album was a moderate success in the UK where it reached gold certification and gave her a UK Top 10 hit with "French Kissin' in the USA". Meanwhile, Burke became a much-in-demand session drummer, playing and touring with Eurythmics for their 1986 album Revenge, and Destri maintained an active career as a producer and session musician.

A remix album entitled Once More into the Bleach was released in 1988, and featured remixes of classic Blondie tracks and material from Harry's solo career, including "Denis" that enters the lower echelons of the UK chart. Harry continued releasing solo albums, Def, Dumb and Blonde (1989) and Debravation (1993) while continuing to tour. Further collections follow with The Complete Picture - The Very Best of Deborah Harry and Blondie reaching No. 3 in UK charts in 1991. In 1993 a rarities album Blond and Beyond appeared while The Platinum Collection was released a year later in the US. A second remix album Beautiful: The Remix Album in 1995 and a live album Picture This Live in 1997.  

1997–2007: Re-formation, No Exit and The Curse of Blondie

During the 1990s, Blondie's past work began to be recognized again by a new generation of fans and artists including Garbage and No Doubt."Blondie Announces Release of Greatest Hits – Sound & Vision, Featuring Brand New Mash-Up With The Doors". PRNewsWire.com. Press Release. Retrieved September 7, 2006. Chrysalis/EMI Records also released several compilations and collections of remixed versions of some of their biggest hits.

Harry continued her moderately successful solo career after the band broke up, releasing albums in 1989 and 1993 which helped keep the band in the public eye. In 1990, she reunited with Stein and Burke for a summer tour of mid-sized venues as part of an "Escape from New York" package with Jerry Harrison, the Tom Tom Club and the Ramones.

In 1996, Stein and Harry began the process of reuniting Blondie and contacted original members Burke, Destri, and Valentine. Valentine had by this time moved to London and become a full-time writer under his real name, Gary Lachman; his New York Rocker: My Life in the Blank Generation (2002) is a memoir of his years with the band. Former members Nigel Harrison and Frank Infante did not participate in the reunion, and they unsuccessfully sued to prevent the reunion under the name Blondie.

In 1997, the original five-piece band re-formed, including Valentine on bass, and did three live performances, all at outdoor festivals sponsored by local radio stations. Their first reunion performance occurred on May 31, 1997, when they played the HFStival at R.F.K. Stadium in Washington, DC. An international tour in late 1998 and early 1999 followed. During this period, without Valentine, they released a cover of Iggy Pop's song "Ordinary Bummer" on the tribute album We Will Fall: The Iggy Pop Tribute (1997) under the pseudonym "Adolph's Dog".

A new album, No Exit (UK No. 3, US No. 18), was released in February 1999. The band was now officially a four-piece, consisting of Harry, Stein, Burke and Destri. Valentine by this point had left the group, and did not play on the album or contribute to the writing of any songs (two songs on the album co-authored by "Valentine" were in fact co-authored by Kathy Valentine of the Go-Go's, no relation to Gary Valentine). Session musicians Leigh Foxx (bass) and Paul Carbonara (guitar) played on this and subsequent Blondie releases.

No Exit reached number three on the UK charts, and the first single, "Maria", which Destri had written thinking about his high school days, became Blondie's sixth UK number one single exactly 20 years after their first chart-topper, "Heart of Glass". This gave the band the distinction of being one of only two American acts to reach number one in the UK singles charts in the 1970s, 1980s and 1990s (the other being Michael Jackson who had No. 1 hits with the Jacksons and solo in the same decades).

The re-formed band released the follow-up album The Curse of Blondie (UK No. 36, US No. 160) in October 2003. Curse proved to be Blondie's lowest-charting album since their debut in 1976, although the single "Good Boys" managed to reach number 12 on the UK charts.

In 2004, Jimmy Destri left the group in order to deal with drug addiction, leaving Harry, Stein and Burke as the only members of the original line-up still with the band. Though Destri's stint in rehab was successful, he was not invited back into the band. He intended to work on their 2011 album Panic Of Girls, but did not contribute as either a songwriter or a musician to the finished product.

In 2005 a new CD/DVD hits package titled Greatest Hits: Sight + Sound was released, peaking at #48 in the UK.

Blondie co-headlined a tour with the New Cars in 2006, releasing a new song, a cover of Roxy Music hit "More than This", in support of the tour.

2008–2012: Parallel Lines 30th Anniversary Tour and Panic of Girls

On June 5, 2008, Blondie commenced a world tour to celebrate the 30th anniversary of Parallel Lines with a concert at Ram's Head Live in Baltimore, Maryland. The tour covered some Eastern and Midwestern US cities throughout the month of June. In July, the tour took the band overseas to Israel, the UK, Russia, Europe and Scandinavia, wrapping up on August 4, 2008, at Store Vega in Copenhagen, Denmark. Inspired by attendances for the tour, Clem Burke and Paul Carbonara both told interviewers in 2008 and 2009 that the band was working on another record, which would be their first new album since the release of The Curse of Blondie in 2003. Carbonara described it as "a real Blondie record."

Blondie undertook a North American tour of mid-sized venues with Pat Benatar and the Donnas in the summer of 2009. Following the tour, in October, the band began recording sessions for their ninth studio album with producer Jeff Saltzman in Woodstock, New York. After playing with the band for over a decade, both Leigh Foxx (bass) and Paul Carbonara (guitar) were elevated to official membership status with Blondie; keyboard player Matt Katz-Bohen, who had replaced Destri, was also made an official member, making Blondie a six-piece band.

In December 2009, the band released the song "We Three Kings" to coincide with the Christmas holiday. The new album, to be titled Panic of Girls, which was being mixed at the time, was said to be ready to follow in 2010. Chris Stein stated that Dutch artist Chris Berens would provide the cover art. In April 2010, it was announced that guitarist Paul Carbonara had amicably left Blondie to pursue other projects and was replaced by Tommy Kessler (the finished Panic of Girls album credits both Kessler and Carbonara as official members).

In June 2010, Blondie began the first leg of a world tour named "Endangered Species Tour", which covered the United Kingdom and Ireland, supported by UK band Little Fish. The set lists featured both classics and new material from the forthcoming Panic of Girls. After a break in July, the tour resumed in August and covered the United States and Canada over a course of six weeks. Blondie then took the "Endangered Species Tour" to Australia and New Zealand in November–December 2010, co-headlining with the Pretenders.

It was first revealed that the band's album was going to be released first in Australia through the Australian Sony label in December 2010, but Sony later backed out of the deal, leaving the album still unreleased. The album's release date was finally set for mid-2011 without the involvement of a major record label. The album was first released in May 2011 as a limited edition "fan pack" in the UK with a 132-page magazine and various collectible items, before being released as a regular CD later in the summer. The lead single, "Mother", was released beforehand as a free download. A music video for the song was released on May 18, 2011. It was directed by Laurent Rejto and features cameos by Kate Pierson from the B-52's, James Lorinz (Frankenhooker), Johnny Dynell, Chi-Chi Valenti, the Dazzle Dancers, Rob Roth, Barbara Sicuranza, Larry Fessenden, Alan Midgette (Andy Warhol's double), The Five Points Band, Guy Furrow, Kitty Boots and Hattie Hathaway. A second single from the album, "What I Heard", was available as a digital release in July 2011

On August 20, 2011, Blondie performed a live set for "Guitar Center Sessions" on DirecTV. The episode included an interview with program host Nic Harcourt.

The band continued to tour regularly into 2012. A concert in New York City was streamed live on YouTube on October 11, 2012. The same week, the band listed three previously unreleased songs recorded during the Panic of Girls sessions ("Bride of Infinity", "Rock On", and "Dead Air") on Amazon.com which were made available for free download in the United States, and in the UK via the band's official website. Another track, "Practice Makes Perfect", was also made available as a free download in November 2012.

2013–present: Ghosts of Download and Pollinator
On March 20, 2013, Harry and Stein were interviewed on the radio show WNYC Soundcheck in which they confirmed they were working on a new Blondie album and previewed a new song entitled "Make a Way". In June and July 2013, the band held a Blast Off Tour of Europe. The US "No Principals Tour" followed in September and October 2013. The first single from the album, "A Rose by Any Name", was released digitally in Europe on June 24, 2013. A second single, "Sugar on the Side", was released digitally in the United States in December 2013.

The album, Ghosts of Download, was released in May 2014 as part of a two-disc package titled Blondie 4(0) Ever (to coincide with the band's 40th anniversary), which also includes Greatest Hits Deluxe Redux, a compilation of re-recordings of Blondie's past singles. The band's official worldwide 40th anniversary tour began in February 2014.

The band announced in the summer of 2015 they would be working on a new album produced by John Congleton. Other collaborators are Johnny Marr, Sia, Charli XCX and Dave Stewart. Blondie recorded a concert for PBS's Soundstage to be aired some time in 2016 and included two new tracks, "My Monster" and "Gravity".

In 2015, Blondie members Harry and Stein made a guest appearance alongside The Gregory Brothers in an episode of the YouTube series Songify the News, where they collaborated again to parody the 2016 United States presidential election debates.

It was announced in January 2017 that the band would support Phil Collins on June 25, 2017, at Dublin's Aviva Stadium as part of his Not Dead Yet tour. The band also toured Australia and New Zealand on a co-headlining tour with Cyndi Lauper.

In the March 2017 issue of Mojo magazine, the band announced that their eleventh studio album, Pollinator, would be released on May 5, 2017. The album was recorded at The Magic Shop in SoHo, New York City, and featured songs written by the likes of TV on the Radio's David Sitek, Johnny Marr, Sia, Charli XCX, and Dev Hynes. Pollinator spawned hit singles "Fun" and "Long Time" and embarked Blondie on an extensive promotional tour in North, Central and South America and Europe. The album peaked at #4 in the UK, and is Blondie's most successful studio album since No Exit.

On December 21, 2019, Blondie announced through their social media that they would release an EP and mini-documentary entitled Vivir en La Habana. It was recorded during the band's residency in Havana, Cuba, in March 2019, and directed by Rob Roth but no dates or further details were revealed yet. The EP is not entirely a "live" recording as Chris Stein, who was not present at the Havana concerts, added guitar parts in the studio to enhance the live tracks. In October 2020, Debbie Harry and Chris Stein of Blondie appeared in Schmoyoho's parody of the 2020 United States presidential debates between vice presidential candidates Kamala Harris and Mike Pence in a song titled "One Heartbeat Away", where they played the role of moderators.

On October 20, 2020, Blondie announced that they would be embarking on a ten-date arena tour of the UK in November 2021 with Garbage as the opening act. The tour was postponed until April 2022 due to the COVID-19 pandemic. Johnny Marr, formerly of The Smiths, replaced Garbage on the tour. Additional dates were subsequently added in the United States. In April 2022 prior to the launch of the UK/US tour, it was announced that Chris Stein would be unable to tour with the group due to heart issues. "I've been dealing with a dumbass condition called Atrial Fibrillation or AFib which is irregular heartbeats and combined with the meds I take for it I'm too fatigued to deal," Stein said. He was replaced by Andee Blacksugar. Bassist Leigh Foxx, too, was absent due to a back injury. Former Sex Pistols bassist Glen Matlock filled in for Foxx.

Style and legacy
By 1982, the year the band initially broke up, Blondie had released six studio albums, each exhibiting a stylistic progression from the last. The band is known not only for the striking stage persona and vocal performances of Debbie Harry but also for incorporating elements in their work from numerous subgenres of music, reaching from their punk roots to embrace new wave, disco,Pareles, Jon, "POP REVIEW; No Debutante: Blondie Returns to Its Roots", The New York Times, February 25, 1999. pop, rap,Ruhlmann, William. "Autoamerican – Blondie". AllMusic. Retrieved November 29, 2011. and reggae.

In March 2006, Blondie, following an introductory speech by Shirley Manson of Garbage, was inducted into the Rock and Roll Hall of Fame. Seven members (Harry, Stein, Burke, Destri, Infante, Harrison and Valentine) were invited to the ceremony, which led to an on-stage spat between the extant group and their former bandmate Frank Infante, who asked during the live broadcast of the ceremony that he and Nigel Harrison be allowed to perform with the group, a request refused by Harry who stated that the band had already rehearsed their performance. On May 22, 2006, Blondie was inducted into the Rock Walk of Fame at Guitar Center on Hollywood's Sunset Boulevard. New inductees are voted on by previous Rock Walk inductees.

Members

Current members
 Debbie Harry – lead vocals 
 Chris Stein – guitar, bass 
 Clem Burke – drums, percussion, backing vocals 
 Leigh Foxx – bass 
 Matt Katz-Bohen – keyboards, backing vocals, guitar 
 Tommy Kessler – guitar 
 Glen Matlock– bass 
 Andee Blacksugar – guitar 

Former members
 Fred Smith – bass 
 Billy O'Connor – drums 
 Ivan Kral – guitar 
 Gary Valentine – bass, guitar 
 Jimmy Destri – keyboards, backing vocals 
 Frank Infante – guitar, backing vocals, bass 
 Nigel Harrison – bass 
 Paul Carbonara – guitar, backing vocals 
 Kevin Patrick  (a.k.a. Kevin Topping)  – keyboards, backing vocals 
 Jimi K Bones – guitar 

Timeline

 Discography Studio albums Blondie (1976)
 Plastic Letters (1977)
 Parallel Lines (1978)
 Eat to the Beat (1979)
 Autoamerican (1980)
 The Hunter (1982)
 No Exit (1999)
 The Curse of Blondie (2003)
 Panic of Girls (2011)
 Ghosts of Download (2014)
 Pollinator (2017)

Tours
Headlining (main tours)
Plastic Letter Tour (1978)
Parallel Lines Tour (1979–1980)
Tracks Across America Tour (1982)
No Exit Tour (1998–1999)
Camp Funtime Summer Tour (2002)
Phasm 8 Tour (2003–2005)
Parallel Lines 30th Anniversary Tour (2008)
Endangered Species Tour (2010)
Panic of Girls Tour (2011)
Blast Off/No Principals Tour (2013)
Pollinator Tour (2017–2019)
Against the Odds Tour (2022)

Co-headlining
Road Rage Tour with The New Cars (2006)
Call Me Invincible Tour with Pat Benatar (2009)
Endangered Species Tour with The Pretenders and Cheap Trick (2010)
Whip It To Shreds Tour with Devo (2012)
No Principals Tour with X (2013)
Rage and Rapture Tour with Garbage (2017)

Awards and nominations
 1980Juno Award for Best Selling Single ("Heart of Glass") (Won)
 1981Grammy Award for Best Rock Performance by a Duo or Group with Vocal ("Call Me") (Nominated)
 1980Juno Award for International Single of the Year ("The Tide Is High") (Nominated)
 1982Grammy Award for Video of the Year ("Eat To The Beat") (Nominated)
 1998Q Music Award for Q Inspiration Award (Won)
 2006Rock and Roll Hall of Fame for Inductees (Won)
 2014NME Award for NME Godlike Genius Award (Won)
 2016Q Music Award for Q Inspiration Award (Won)
 2016Grammy Hall of Fame for "Heart of Glass" (Inducted)
 2022BBC Longshots Audience Award for Blondie: Vivir en la Habana (Won'')
2023Grammy Award for Best Historical Album for Against the Odds: 1974–1982 (Pending)
2023 – Songwriters Hall of Fame (nomination''')

See also
 List of best-selling albums
 List of artists by number of UK Singles Chart number ones
 List of million-selling singles in the United Kingdom

Notes and references

External links

 
 
 The Complete Blondie Discography
 Blondie at 45cat.com 
 
 Blondie discography at Discogs
 Blondie's New York Documentary on Smithsonian Channel

 
American power pop groups
Chrysalis Records artists
Musical groups established in 1974
Musical groups disestablished in 1982
Musical groups reestablished in 1997
American new wave musical groups
American pop rock music groups
Punk rock groups from New York (state)
Musical groups from New York City
NME Awards winners
Rock music groups from New York (state)
Juno Award winners
Private Stock Records artists
Female-fronted musical groups